Summer, 1976 is a Broadway play written by David Auburn. The story follows two women living in Ohio during the summer of 1976, the American Bicentennial. It is set to begin previews at the Samuel J. Friedman Theatre on April 4, 2023, with an opening date set for April 25.

Production 
The play was originally announced to debut in late 2022 Off-Broadway, but was moved to April 2023 by the Manhattan Theatre Club, which is producing the show.

The Broadway production stars Laura Linney as Diana and Jessica Hecht as Alice. Daniel Sullivan directs, with set design by John Lee Beatty, lighting design by Japhy Weideman, costume design by Linda Cho, sound design by Jill BC Du Boff, and projection design by Hana S. Kim.

Premise 
Diana, an artist and single mother, and Alice, a free-spirited and naive young housewife, forge an unlikely friendship one night in Ohio.

External links 

 Official website
 Summer, 1976 at the IBDB

References 

2023 plays
Broadway plays
Plays set in the 1970s
Plays set in Ohio